The  is a professional wrestling championship in , a sub-brand of the Japanese promotion DDT Pro-Wrestling. The title, named after the Kōkū-kōen Park Town shopping street near Kōkū-kōen Station, was established in 2019 and was only contested in its inaugural match, in Tokorozawa, Saitama.

Title history
Keisuke Ishii was crowned the first champion after he pinned Shuhei Washida in a Falls Count Anywhere tag team match. He was awarded the title by the manager of the Fresh Ariyama store where the match took place. Since then, the title has never been defended, nor has it been officially deactivated.

Reigns

See also

DDT Pro-Wrestling
Professional wrestling in Japan

References

DDT Pro-Wrestling championships